Silver Case is a multi-awarded independent feature film, produced and directed by Christian Filippella, starring Oscar Nominees actors Eric Roberts and Seymour Cassel, Brian Keith Gamble, Chris Facey, Vincent De Paul, Shalim Ortiz, Claire Falconer, Kelvin Han Yee, Brad Light, Art Hsu, Stanely B. Herman, and Fernanda Romero.

Silver Case premiered at the Rome Film Festival and has received many awards worldwide. The film also won 5 Indie Awards at the Indie Fest, best feature and best director at the LA Film & TV Festival and the Spirit of Independent Award at the 26th Fort Lauderdale International Film Festival.

The film was shot at various locations in California and Italy.

Film Festivals Official Selection

 New Filmmakers Program NY (2012)
 Laughlin International Film Festival (2012)
 Salento International Film Festival (2012)
 Los Angeles Film & TV Film Festival (2012)
 Long Island International Film Festival (2012)
 Fantafilmfestival (2012)
 Hoboken International Film Festival (2012)
 Big Island International Film Festival (2012)
 San Diego Black Film Festival (2012)
 St. Augustine Film Festival (2012)
 Vegas Cine Fest (2012)
 Daytona Beach Film Festival (2011)
 Rome International Film Festival (2011)
 Cannes Film Festival (2011)
 Fort Lauderdale International Film Festival (2011)
 Bahamas International Film Festival (2011)
 Daytona Beach Film Festival (2011)

Awards 

 Best Feature Film - Los Angeles Film & TV Awards (2012)
 Best Actor -Vincent De Paul (actor)- Los Angeles Film & TV Awards(2012)
 Best Director - Los Angeles Film & TV Awards (2012)
 Frank Currier's Actor Award - Jury Prize Eric Roberts - Los Island Film Festival (2012)
 First Runner Up - Vegas Cine Fest (2012)
 Indie Fest Award - Award of Excellence - Lead Actor Eric Roberts (2012)
 Indie Fest Award - Award of Excellence - Lead Actor Brian Keith Gamble (2012)
 Indie Fest Award - Award of Merit/Excellence - Supporting Actress Claire Falconer (2012)
 Indie Fest Award - Award of Merit/Excellence - Direction Christian Filippella (2012)
 Accolade Award - Lead Actor Brian Keith Gamble (2012)
 Accolade Award - Direction Christian Filippella (2012)
 Global Music Award - Original Song Sweetly Dream by Brian Keith Gamble (2012)
 Global Music Award - Songwriter Brian Keith Gamble (2012)
 Spirit of Independent Award FLIFF 2011 (2011)
 Merit Award Bahamas on Location 2011 (2011)

Cast
 Eric Roberts as Senator
 Shalim Ortiz as Tuco
 Brian Keith Gamble as Barabba
 Chris Facey as Caesar
 Seymour Cassel as Art Dealer
 Vincent De Paul (actor) as Doug Damian
 Claire Falconer as Margot
 Brad Light as Master
 Kelvin Han Yee as Business Man 1 
 Art Hsu as Business Man 2
 Andrea Boccaletti as Locksmith
 Stanley B. Herman as Money Man
 Fernanda Romero as Lola
 Yuri Lowenthal as Donnie

References

External links
 
Claire goes to Cannes with new film (Impartial Reporter, March 17th 2011)
 Taking Silver Case to the film market at Cannes (Filmslate Magazine, May 11, 2011
 Anteprime e giovani talenti: Christian Filippella (GQ Italia, May 16, 2011
 Un Italiano a Los Angeles (Film For Life, Nov 13, 2011

2011 films
American action comedy films
American crime comedy films
Italian comedy films
English-language Italian films
2010s English-language films
2010s American films